Gary Stix is a journalist and author.  He is a Senior Editor at the Scientific American.

Education
Stix obtained his undergraduate degree in journalism from New York University.

Personal
He is married to Miriam Lacob.

Career
Stix is a senior editor for Scientific American and has worked there for over 20 years. He is currently responsible for covering neuroscience. He has frequently been the issue or section editor for special issues of the magazine. He also reports and commissions articles on a variety of other topics ranging from nanotechnology to obesity. Prior to working for Scientific American, Stix spent 3 years as a science journalist at IEEE Spectrum. He and his wife wrote a general primer on technology called "Who Gives a Gigabyte?"

Bibliography

Articles

References

Stix,Gary
American male journalists
Living people
Stix,Gary
Year of birth missing (living people)
Scientific American people